The FBI Most Wanted Terrorists is a list created and first released on October 10, 2001, with the authority of United States President George W. Bush, following the September 11 attacks on the United States. Initially, the list contained 22 of the top suspected terrorists chosen by the FBI, all of whom had earlier been indicted for acts of terrorism between 1985 and 1998. None of the 22 had been captured by US or other authorities by that date. Of the 22, only Osama Bin Laden was by then already listed on the FBI Ten Most Wanted Fugitives list.

No particular legal consequences flowed from the creation of and inclusion on the list. On January 17, 2002, the FBI released a third major FBI wanted list, which has now become known as the FBI Seeking Information – War on Terrorism list, to enlist the public's help in reporting information which may prevent future terrorist attacks. The information sought to be reported is not necessarily relating to any person on any of the FBI wanted lists.

Initial persons alleged to be terrorist fugitives
On the fugitive group wanted poster, the FBI did not list the persons in any particular stated order, except perhaps for the consistent placing of bin Laden in the number one position of the top row. However, the 22 can easily fit into distinct categories over the two decades, based on the terrorist attacks in which they were, according to US authorities, involved.

For organization and ease of reference here, the 22 on the list are grouped by the attack for which they were placed on the list.

FBI Seeking Information – War on Terrorism list
Whereas the Most Wanted Terrorists list is reserved for terrorist fugitives who have been indicted by federal grand juries, the FBI recognized a further need to achieve a much quicker response time in order to prevent any future attacks which may be in the current planning stages. To enlist the public's help in this effort, the FBI sought a way to deliver the early known suspected terror attack information, often very limited, out to the public as quickly as possible. So, on January 17, 2002, the third major FBI wanted list was first released, which has now become known as the FBI Seeking Information – Terrorism list.

As the name of this list implies, the FBI's intent is to acquire any critical information from the public, as soon as possible, about the suspected terrorists, who may be in the planning stages of terror attacks against United States nationals at home and abroad. The first such list profiled five persons about whom little was known, but who were suspected of plotting terrorist attacks in martyrdom operations. The main evidence against the five was five videos they had produced, found in the rubble of Mohammed Atef's destroyed home outside Kabul, Afghanistan.

Additions to the list
By 2006, more than four years had passed since the FBI had listed the original 22 alleged terrorists on the Most Wanted Terrorist list. Of those 22, by then four had been qualified for removal from the list, due to death or capture. Also by then, the FBI determined that new persons qualified to be listed as Most Wanted Terrorists. Some of these persons were indicted for attacks and plots that had taken place since the original list had been compiled. The original indictments had been for incidents only through 1998. Since then, the U.S. had become victim to at least two major terror attacks, which would generate some of the new indictments for the Most Wanted Terrorists, notably:

 USS Cole bombing in 2000, which killed 17 American sailors and wounded 40 on October 12, 2000, off the port coast of Aden, Yemen
 September 11, 2001 attacks in Manhattan, Washington D.C., and Pennsylvania

In addition, after the original 2001 list had been compiled and released to the public, the U.S. had foiled and issued indictments for numerous other plots, involving some new listed Most Wanted Terrorists. Those notable other plots involved:

 The Buffalo Six, a Buffalo, New York cell, or Lackawanna Cell, exposed September 2002
 Palestinian Islamic Jihad, on Racketeer Influenced and Corrupt Organizations Act (RICO) charges for plots based from Syria since 1995
 Abu Sayyaf kidnappings and murders of foreign nationals in the Philippines
In February 2006, the FBI completed two groups of additions to the Most Wanted Terrorists list, the first such additions in over four years. On February 24, 2006, the day after adding two name to the list, the FBI added an additional six fugitive terrorists, for various plots and attacks. One of the entries was for an indictment dating back to the June 14, 1985, hijacking of TWA flight 847 by Hezbollah (see above).

Additionally, the FBI also added to the Seeking Information – War on Terrorism list an additional three persons, most notably, Abu Musab al-Zarqawi, the notorious leader of Al-Qaeda in Iraq. This marked the first time that al-Zarqawi had appeared on any of the three major FBI wanted lists. On June 8, 2006, ABC News reported that Abu Musab al-Zarqawi was confirmed to have been killed in Baghdad in a bombing raid by a United States task force. His death was confirmed by multiple sources in Iraq, including the United States government.

Rewards
Since 1984, the United States government has also used the Rewards for Justice Program, which pays monetary rewards of up to $25 million, or now, in some cases more, upon special authorization by the United States Secretary of State, to individuals who provide information which substantially leads to countering of terrorist attacks against United States persons. More than $100 million had been paid to over 60 people through this program.

The Rewards for Justice Program was established by the 1984 Act to Combat International Terrorism, Public Law 98-533, and is administered by the Bureau of Diplomatic Security, within the U.S. Department of State.

See also
 FBI Ten Most Wanted Fugitives
 Terrorist incidents
 War on terror
 Weapons of mass destruction

References

External links

 DSS Rewards for Justice
 FBI Most Wanted Terrorists currently listed page
 America's Most Wanted - slideshow by Life magazine

 
Hezbollah
Abu Sayyaf
Terrorism in Lebanon
Al-Qaeda
Counterterrorism in the United States
War on terror